The 1958 Alaska gubernatorial election took place on November 25, 1958, for the post of Governor of Alaska. It was Alaska's first gubernatorial election as a U.S. state, although this did not take effect until January 3, 1959. Democratic Shadow Senator William A. Egan and his running mate Hugh Wade defeated Republican State Senator John Butrovich and his running mate, former territorial tax commissioner K.F. Dewey.

Results

References

Gubernatorial
1958
Alaska
Alaska gubernatorial election